Sébastien Gimbert (born 9 September 1977 in Le Puy-en-Velay, France) is a professional motorcycle road racer. He currently competes in the Endurance FIM World Championship aboard a Honda CBR1000RR. His greatest success has come in the Endurance World Championship, and the bulk of his career has been spent on Yamaha YZF-R1 with more recent seasons spent on BMW S1000RR and Honda CBR1000RR motorcycles.

He was France's 250cc champion in 1996 and 1997, before moving up to the 500cc World Championship on a privately entered Honda in 1998 and 1999, and racing in the 250cc World Championship in 2000, without many front-running displays.

From 2002 to 2004 he was primarily an endurance racer. He has won the biggest 24-hour races in the sport - Le Mans, Spa-Francorchamps and the Bol d'Or. He helped the team to the Endurance World Championship in 2004.

Gimbert also remained active in shorter races, finishing 2nd in the French Super Production series in 2003 and doing several rounds a year later.

He raced in the Supersport World Championship for  finishing 20th overall. He also won the 2007 Bol d'Or endurance race.

Career statistics
1993 - 2nd, French Yamaha TZR125 Championship Yamaha TZR125
1994 - 11th, French 125cc Championship Honda RS125R
1995 - 4th, French 250cc Championship Honda RS250R
1996 - 5th, European 250cc Championship Honda RS250R / 1st, French 250cc Championship Honda RS250R
1997 - 6th, European 250cc Championship Honda RS250R / 1st, French 250cc Championship #1 Honda RS250R
1998 - 30th, 500cc Grand Prix #22 Honda NSR500V
1999 - 19th, 500cc Grand Prix #22 Honda NSR500V
2000 - 22nd, 500cc Grand Prix #22 Honda NSR500V / 22nd, 250cc World Championship Honda RS250R
2001 - French Supersport 600 Championship #22 Honda CBR600RR
2002 - 1st, Le Mans 24 Hours / 1st, Bol d'Or Suzuki GSX-R1000
2003 - 2nd, Le Mans 24 Hours / 1st, 24 Hours of Spa / 1st, Bol d'Or Suzuki GSX-R1000
2004 - 1st, Endurance FIM World Championship #94 Yamaha YZF-R1
2005 - 16th, Superbike World Championship #32 Yamaha YZF-R1
2006 - 19th, Superbike World Championship #16 Yamaha YZF-R1
2007 - 20th, Supersport World Championship #194 Yamaha YZF-R6 / 7th, Endurance FIM World Championship #94 Yamaha YZF-R1
2008 - 29th, Superbike World Championship #194 Yamaha YZF-R1
2009 - 1st, French Superbike Championship #94 Yamaha YZF-R1
2010 - 2nd, French Superbike Championship #1 BMW S1000RR / 9th, Endurance FIM World Championship #94 Yamaha YZF-R1
2011 - 1st, French Superbike Championship #7 BMW S1000RR / 2nd, Endurance FIM World Championship #99 BMW S1000RR
2012 - 2nd, French Superbike Championship #7 BMW S1000RR / 2nd, Endurance FIM World Championship #99 BMW S1000RR
2013 - 17th, CIV Superbike Championship #7 BMW S1000RR / 12th, Endurance FIM World Championship #99 BMW S1000RR
2014 - 2nd, French Superbike Championship #7    Honda CBR1000RR / 7th, Endurance FIM World Championship #111    Honda CBR1000RR
2015 - 3rd, French Superbike Championship #7    Honda CBR1000RR / 9th, Endurance FIM World Championship #111    Honda CBR1000RR
2016 - Endurance FIM World Championship #111    Honda CBR1000RR

External links
 sebgimbert.com Official website

1977 births
Living people
Superbike World Championship riders
250cc World Championship riders
500cc World Championship riders
French motorcycle racers
Supersport World Championship riders
People from Le Puy-en-Velay
Sportspeople from Haute-Loire